The 2016 AFC Champions League knockout stage was played from 17 May to 26 November 2016. A total of 16 teams competed in the knockout stage to decide the champions of the 2016 AFC Champions League.

Qualified teams
The winners and runners-up of each of the eight groups in the group stage qualified for the knockout stage. Both West Zone and East Zone had eight qualified teams.

Format

In the knockout stage, the 16 teams played a single-elimination tournament, with the teams split between the two zones until the final. Each tie was played on a home-and-away two-legged basis. The away goals rule, extra time (away goals do not apply in extra time) and penalty shoot-out were used to decide the winner if necessary (Regulations Article 12.3).

Schedule
The schedule of each round was as follows.

Bracket
The bracket of the knockout stage was determined as follows:
Round of 16: (group winners host second legs)

West Zone
Winner Group A vs. Runner-up Group C
Winner Group C vs. Runner-up Group A
Winner Group B vs. Runner-up Group D
Winner Group D vs. Runner-up Group B

East Zone
Winner Group E vs. Runner-up Group G
Winner Group G vs. Runner-up Group E
Winner Group F vs. Runner-up Group H
Winner Group H vs. Runner-up Group F

Quarterfinals: (matchups and order of legs decided by draw)

West Zone
QF1
QF2

East Zone
QF3
QF4

Semifinals: (Winners QF1 and QF3 host first leg, Winners QF2 and QF4 host second leg)

West Zone
SF1: Winner QF1 vs. Winner QF2

East Zone
SF2: Winner QF3 vs. Winner QF4

Final: Winner SF1 vs. Winner SF2 (Winner SF2 host first leg, Winner SF1 host second leg)

Round of 16

In the round of 16, the winners of one group played the runners-up of another group from the same zone, with the group winners hosting the second leg.

|-
|+West Zone

|}

|+East Zone

|}

West Zone

Lokomotiv Tashkent won 2–1 on aggregate.

Al-Nasr won 5–4 on aggregate.

Al-Ain won 3–1 on aggregate.

El Jaish won 6–4 on aggregate.

East Zone

Jeonbuk Hyundai Motors won 3–2 on aggregate.

2–2 on aggregate. Shanghai SIPG won on away goals.

3–3 on aggregate. FC Seoul won 7–6 on penalties.

3–3 on aggregate. Shandong Luneng won on away goals.

Quarter-finals

In the quarter-finals, the four teams from the West Zone were drawn into two ties, and the four teams from the East Zone were drawn into the other two ties, with the order of legs also decided by the draw.

The draw for the quarter-finals was held on 9 June 2016, 16:00 MYT (UTC+8), at the Petaling Jaya Hilton Hotel in Kuala Lumpur, Malaysia. There was no seeding or country protection, so teams from the same association could be drawn into the same tie.

|-
|+West Region

|}

|+East Region

|}

West Zone

Al-Ain won 1–0 on aggregate.

The El Jaish v Al-Nasr first leg, originally won 3–0 by Al-Nasr, was forfeited and awarded 3–0 to El Jaish by the AFC Disciplinary Committee on 12 September 2016, as Al-Nasr fielded the player Wanderley, who was found to be registered using a fake Indonesian passport.

El Jaish won 4–0 on aggregate.

East Zone

Jeonbuk Hyundai Motors won 5–0 on aggregate.

FC Seoul won 4–2 on aggregate.

Semi-finals

In the semi-finals, the two quarter-final winners from the West Zone play each other, and the two quarter-final winners from the East Zone play each other, with the order of legs determined by the quarter-final draw.

|-
|+West Region

|}

|+East Region

|}

West Zone

Al-Ain won 5–3 on aggregate.

East Zone

Jeonbuk Hyundai Motors won 5–3 on aggregate.

Final

In the final, the two semi-final winners play each other, with the order of legs reversed from the previous season's final, with the team from the East Zone hosting the first leg, and the team from the West Zone hosting the second leg.|}

Jeonbuk Hyundai Motors won 3–2 on aggregate.

References

External links
AFC Champions League, the-AFC.com

3